= Deepfake (film) =

2026 independent comedy film

- Promotional poster
- Directed by: Matt Eames
- Written by: Matt Eames
- Produced by: Federica Mary Lai
- Starring: Jessica DiGiovanni; Sophia Lucia Parola; Jocelyn Weisman
- Cinematography: Robert Bevis
- Edited by: Matt Eames
- Music by: Rubber Band Gun
- Production company: Back Bay Studios
- Release date: June 6, 2026 (Tribeca Festival)
- Running time: 86 minutes
- Countries: United States; Italy
- Language: English

Deepfake is a 2026 independent comedy film written and directed by Matt Eames.

The film premiered at the Tribeca Festival on June 6, 2026.

== Premise ==
A woman in the throes of an existential crisis tries to optimize her way back to sanity, one lifestyle app at a time.

== Cast ==
- Jessica DiGiovanni as Jane
- Sophia Lucia Parola as Zoe
- Jocelyn Weisman
- Jetta Juriansz as Isabella
- Ethan Jovanovic as Leonard
- Nick Cabot Rodriguez as Tyler

== Production ==
It was the first narrative feature to use the Fujinon 25-1000mm DUVO lens. The film was selected to be screened at the 25th Tribeca Festival in 2026.

== Release ==
Deepfake premiered at the Tribeca Festival on June 6, 2026.
